Sultan Mohammed Zarawani (born 24 January 1961) is a former Emirati cricketer.  He played seven one-day internationals. After the 1996 Cricket World Cup, he was banned for life when he criticised the officials of the Emirates Cricket Board. He learnt the basics of the sport while studying at his school in Pakistan.

International career
In the early 1990s, when the Emirates Cricket Board adopted a policy of recruiting expatriate cricketers from Pakistan, India and Sri Lanka for the national side, Zarawani, the sole native Emirati in the team, was appointed as captain.

Under his leadership, the UAE won the 1994 ICC Trophy in Kenya which earned them qualification for the 1996 Cricket World Cup. He also captained the UAE in their first-ever One Day International match which was played against India. Although his team was defeated, Zarawani did manage to capture one wicket – that of Sachin Tendulkar.

He is best known for facing South African fast bowler Allan Donald without a helmet at the 1996 Cricket World Cup and being hit by a fierce bouncer. Sultan had only wore a sunhat on his head. He came to bat when UAE was reeling at 68/6 in a huge run chase of 322.

Donald recorded in his autobiography that he feared initially that he had killed him. Despite the blow, Zarawani still continued to refuse the offer of a helmet but only lasted six more balls before he was dismissed and taken straight to hospital. Prior to playing in his first World Cup tournament in 1996, he had received three operations on his knees and also underwent regular cortisone injections in order to enable him to play through the pain. He also spent 24 hours in bed before every match to make himself fit to play. He led at the age of 35. Despite the blow on his head in UAE's opening match against South Africa, he continued to play in the remainder of the tournament and also went onto lead the side throughout the global showpiece. Under his leadership, UAE finished the tournament on a high note by securing a victory over fellow qualifier Netherlands and it also eventually marked the last international appearance for Zarawani in international cricket.

The only locally produced player on the 1996 side, Zarawani was purportedly held in very high esteem by his teammates, of whom there were allegedly fewer than the pricey motor cars in his possession.

He left the international game with ODI batting and bowling averages of 4.33 and 51 respectively. "Swap the figures round, as they say, and you'd have one hell of an allrounder," mused Lawrence Booth.

Legacy 
The iconic moment which was created when Sultan Zarawani faced a rampant Allan Donald has also been included in the ‘'Second XI: Cricket in its Outposts'’, a book which talks about the evolution of associate cricket. The book also illustrate why he went onto face Allan Donald with a sunhat on his head instead of a helmet and Zarawani himself recalled the incident and shared his experiences on the book.

References

External links 
 Booth, Lawrence. "Myths; And stereotypes." The Spin, 30 June 2009.

Remembering Sultan Zarawani – Sidin Vadukut, Cricinfo

1961 births
Living people
Emirati cricket captains
Emirati cricketers
United Arab Emirates One Day International cricketers
Sportspeople from Dubai